Romania competed at the 1960 Summer Olympics in Rome, Italy. 98 competitors, 82 men and 16 women, took part in 65 events in 13 sports.

Medalists

|  style="text-align:left; width:72%; vertical-align:top;"|

| style="text-align:left; width:23%; vertical-align:top;"|

Gold
 Iolanda Balaş — Athletics, Women's High Jump
 Ion Dumitrescu — Shooting, Men's Trap
 Dumitru Pârvulescu — Wrestling, Men's Greco-Roman Flyweight

Silver
 Ion Cernea — Wrestling, Men's Men's Greco-Roman Bantamweight

Bronze
 Lia Manoliu — Athletics, Women's Discus Throw
 Ion Monea — Boxing, Men's Middleweight (—75 kg)
 Leon Rotman — Canoeing, Men's C-1 1000m
 Maria Vicol — Fencing, Women's Individual Foil
 Atanasia Ionescu, Sonia Iovan, Elena Leuşteanu, Emilia Vătăşoiu-Liţă, Elena Niculescu, Uta Poreceanu — Gymnastics, Women's Team All-Around
 Ion Ţăranu — Wrestling, Men's Greco-Roman Middleweight

Athletics

Boxing

Canoeing

Cycling

Six cyclists, all males, represented Romania in 1960.

Individual road race
 Ion Cosma
 Gheorghe Calcişcă
 Gabriel Moiceanu
 Aurel Şelaru

Team time trial
 Ion Cosma
 Gabriel Moiceanu
 Aurel Şelaru
 Ludovic Zanoni

1000m time trial
 Ion Ioniţă

Equestrian

Fencing

15 fencers, 11 men and 4 women, represented Romania in 1960.

Men's foil
 Tănase Mureșanu
 Attila Csipler
 Ion Drîmbă

Men's team foil
 Iosif Szilaghi, Sorin Poenaru, Attila Csipler, Tănase Mureșanu

Men's épée
 Adalbert Gurath, Jr.

Men's sabre
 Ladislau Rohony
 Emeric Arus
 Dumitru Mustață

Men's team sabre
 Dumitru Mustață, Cornel Pelmuș, Ion Santo, Ladislau Rohony, Emeric Arus

Women's foil
 Maria Vicol
 Olga Orban-Szabo
 Ecaterina Orb-Lazăr

Women's team foil
 Ecaterina Orb-Lazăr, Eugenia Mateianu, Olga Orban-Szabo, Maria Vicol

Gymnastics

Rowing

Romania had eight male rowers participate in four out of seven rowing events in 1960.

Men

Shooting

Nine shooters represented Romania in 1960. Ion Dumitrescu won the gold medal in the trap event.

25 m pistol
 Ştefan Petrescu
 Gavril Maghiar

50 m pistol
 Gavril Maghiar
 Ilie Nițu

300 m rifle, three positions
 Constantin Antonescu
 Marin Ferecatu

50 m rifle, three positions
 Iosif Sîrbu
 Nicolae Rotaru

50 m rifle, prone
 Iosif Sîrbu
 Nicolae Rotaru

Trap
 Ion Dumitrescu
 Gheorghe Enache

Swimming

Water polo

Weightlifting

Wrestling

References

External links
Official Olympic Reports
International Olympic Committee results database

Nations at the 1960 Summer Olympics
1960
1960 in Romanian sport